Torrefeta i Florejacs is a municipality in the province of Lleida and autonomous community of Catalonia, Spain. The municipality is split into two parts, separated by the municipality of Sanaüja. The bigger southern part contains nearly all the population.

References

External links
 Government data pages 

Municipalities in Segarra